The National Museum of China flanks the eastern side of Tiananmen Square in Beijing, China. The museum's mission is to educate about the arts and history of China. It is directed by the Ministry of Culture and Tourism of the People's Republic of China.

History
The museum was established in 2003  by the merging of the two separate museums that had occupied the same building since 1959: the Museum of the Chinese Revolution in the northern wing (originating in the Office of the National Museum of the Revolution founded in 1950 to preserve the legacy of the 1949 revolution) and the National Museum of Chinese History in the southern wing (with origins in both the Beijing National History Museum, founded in 1949, and the Preliminary Office of the National History Museum, founded in 1912, tasked to safeguard China's larger historical legacy).

The building was completed in 1959 as one of the Ten Great Buildings celebrating the ten-year anniversary of the founding of the People's Republic of China. It complements the opposing Great Hall of the People that was built at the same time. The front displays ten square pillars at its center.

After four years of renovation, the museum reopened on March 17, 2011, with 28 new exhibition halls, more than triple the previous exhibition space, and state of the art exhibition and storage facilities. It has a total floor space of nearly 200,000 m2 (2.2 million square feet) to display. The renovations were designed by the German firm Gerkan, Marg and Partners.

Due to the COVID-19 pandemic, the museum was closed for a large part of 2020, and attendance plunged by 78 percent to 1,600,000.  Nonetheless, in 2021 it was in second place in  the list of most-visited art museums, after the Louvre Museum.

Collections
The museum, covering Chinese history from the Yuanmou Man of 1.7 million years ago to the end of the Qing Dynasty (the last imperial dynasty in Chinese history), has a permanent collection of 1,050,000 items, with many precious and rare artifacts not to be found in museums anywhere else in China or the rest of the world.

Among the most important items in the National Museum of China are the "Houmuwu Ding" from the Shang Dynasty (the heaviest piece of ancient bronzeware in the world, at 832.84 kg), the square shaped Shang Dynasty bronze zun decorated with four sheep heads, a large and rare inscribed Western Zhou Dynasty bronze water pan, a gold-inlaid Qin Dynasty bronze tally in the shape of a tiger, Han Dynasty jade burial suits sewn with gold thread, and a comprehensive collection of Tang Dynasty tri-colored glazed sancai and Song Dynasty ceramics. The museum also has an important numismatic collection, including 15,000 coins donated by Luo Bozhao.

The museum has a permanent exhibition called The Road to Rejuvenation, which presents the recent history of China since the beginning of the First Opium War, with an emphasis on the history of the Chinese Communist Party (CCP) and its political achievements.

On April 9, 2021, the exhibition "Field of Hope: A National Photographic Exhibition on 'Poverty Alleviation and Sharing a Moderately Prosperous Society opened at the museum.  The exhibition, hosted by the China Federation of Literary and Art Circles, the National Museum of China and the China Photographers Association, features 180 photographs by nearly 150 different photographers, showcasing the country’s effort in alleviating poverty.

Gallery

Countdown clocks

Because of its central location in Tiananmen Square, the front of the museum has been used since the 1990s for the display of countdown clocks relating to occasions of national importance, including the 1997 transfer of sovereignty of Hong Kong, the 1999 transfer of sovereignty of Macau, the beginning of the 2008 Beijing Olympics, and the opening of the 2010 World Expo in Shanghai.

Controversies
A three-month exhibition of the luxury brand Louis Vuitton in 2011 led to some complaints of commercialism at the museum, with Peking University professor Xia Xueluan stating that as a state-level public museum, it "should in fact only be dedicating itself to non-profit cultural promotion."  Yves Carcelle, chairman and chief executive officer of Louis Vuitton Malletier, defended the exhibition by stating: "What's important is what you are going to discover. I think before money, there's history: 157 years of creativity and craftsmanship."

Some critics have also alleged the museum's modern historiography tends to focus on the triumphs of the CCP, while minimizing or ignoring politically sensitive subjects such as the Great Leap Forward and the Cultural Revolution.

See also
 List of most visited art museums
 List of museums in China
Palace Museum
 National Palace Museum
 State Administration of Cultural Heritage
 Ministry of Culture

Bibliography
Kirk A. Denton, Exhibiting the Past: Historical Memory and the Politics of Museums in Postsocialist China (University of Hawaii Press, 2014), pp. 33–39, 45–74.

References

External links

 Official Website

 
Buildings and structures completed in 1959
Gerkan, Marg and Partners buildings
Museums in Beijing
National first-grade museums of China
Tiananmen Square
2003 establishments in China